Agdistis danutae is a moth in the family Pterophoridae. It is known from Namibia.

The wingspan is about 20 mm. The forewings are grey with four dark dots, two in the discal area and at the costal margin. The other two are found in the middle part and at the wing base. The hindwings are uniformly grey. Adults are on wing in April.

Etymology
The species is named after Dr Danuta J. Plisko of Pietermaritzburg, South Africa.

References

Agdistinae